Katherine Elizabeth Webb-McCarron (born April 24, 1989), is an American model, beauty queen, and television personality. She was Miss Alabama USA 2012 and is perhaps best known for her appearance during the broadcast of the 2013 BCS National Championship Game.

Early life
Katherine Webb was born in Montgomery, Alabama, to Alan and Leslie Webb.

Pageant history
In 2007, Webb was a semi-finalist in the Miss Georgia USA 2008 pageant. She was crowned Miss Alabama USA in 2012, and then went on to finish in the Top 10 of the Miss USA 2012 competition.

BCS National Championship Game appearance
Webb, who was then the girlfriend (now wife) of Alabama quarterback A. J. McCarron, gained national attention during the 2013 BCS National Championship Game telecast, in which announcer Brent Musburger talked about Webb when the broadcast image centered on her as she sat watching the game in the audience. Musburger referred to her as a "lovely lady" and "beautiful", and remarked to his broadcast partner, former quarterback Kirk Herbstreit, "You quarterbacks get all the good-looking women." Musberger then punctuated his comments exclaiming "Whoa!" and "Wow!" and then remarked that Alabama youngsters should start practicing football in the backyard in order to meet such women in college.

After the game, media coverage of Musburger's remarks on Webb was widespread.

Some of the media coverage of Webb had focused on her being an Auburn University graduate, because of the long Auburn–Alabama sports rivalry. Many media commentators compared Musberger's remarks on Webb to Musberger's earlier remarks on the then-unknown Jenn Sterger at the 2005 Florida State–Miami game; Musberger had pointed out Sterger in the crowd and said "1,500 red-blooded Americans just decided to apply to Florida State", thereby launching Sterger to fame and eventually a career in journalism.

Due to the incident, the number of followers on Webb's Twitter account jumped overnight from about 2,000 to over 175,000. Among her new Twitter followers were NBA star LeBron James, and Webb received messages from NFL defensive end Darnell Dockett and Georgia Bulldogs quarterback Aaron Murray. The next day, the phrase "AJ McCarron girlfriend" was one of Google's highest trending terms, with over 1 million searches. A YouTube video of her appearance in the game has garnered over 3 million views.

Some coverage was critical of Musburger's comments as sexist, and an ESPN spokesperson issued an apology. Webb told Matt Lauer that she was not offended by the remarks and did not feel an apology from ESPN was necessary. "I think the media has been really unfair to [Musburger] ... I think that if he would have said ... that we were hot or sexy or made any derogatory statements like that, I think that would have been a little bit different. But the fact that he said we were beautiful and gorgeous, I don't see why any woman wouldn't be flattered by that," she added.

The incident was revisited by Brent Musburger himself in 2018 when AJ McCarron was traded by the Buffalo Bills to the Oakland Raiders, the team whose games Musburger would begin calling on radio that year. "Can't wait for the 'beautiful' Mrs. McCarron to join us in Oakland," he posted on Twitter.

Post-BCS celebrity
After coverage of Webb on the BCS National Championship Game catapulted her popularity and sparked mass interest in her, Donald Trump, owner of the Miss USA pageant, offered Webb a position as a Miss USA judge. She accepted an offer from Inside Edition to cover Super Bowl XLVII.

Webb landed a spot as a contestant on Splash, formerly known as Celebrity Diving. She tied for the highest mark in the third week of the competition, but withdrew in the fifth week due to a back injury. She appeared as a model in the 2013 Sports Illustrated Swimsuit Issue.

Personal life
Webb and A. J. McCarron announced their engagement in March 2014 and were married on July 12, 2014 in Orange Beach, Alabama. She announced on December 8, 2015, that she was four months pregnant with their first son to whom she gave birth in May 2016.  In December 2018, Webb gave birth to a second son. In March 2021, Webb gave birth to the couple's third son.

Webb is an Evangelical Christian and is frequently involved in her church. McCarron, her husband, is a devout Catholic Christian.

References

External links
 
 
 Official Miss Alabama USA website
 Official Miss USA website

1989 births
Living people
American evangelicals
Auburn University alumni
Christians from Alabama
Female models from Alabama
Miss Alabama USA winners
Miss USA 2012 delegates
Participants in American reality television series
People from Montgomery, Alabama